Kaiser Mahal is a Rana palace in Kathmandu, the capital of Nepal. The palace complex, located west of the Narayanhity Palace, was incorporated in an impressive and vast array of courtyards, gardens and buildings.

History

The palace complex lay in the heart of Kathmandu, to the west of the Narayanhity Palace.

Initially the land area of Keshar mahal was occupied by a small palace of one of the sons of Commander-in-Chief Dhir Shumsher and younger brother of Bir Shumsher JBR, Lt. General Jeet Shumsher J. B. Rana. Later Jeet Shumsher sold his palace to Chandra Shamsher Jang Bahadur Rana, who then destroyed the old palace and build a new palace in 1895 for his son Kaiser Shamsher Jang Bahadur Rana with pavilions, fountains, decorative garden furniture, and European-inspired pergolas, balustrades, urns, and statues. He erected six freestanding pavilions, each dedicated to one of the six seasons of Nepal. These unique and impressive Edwardian features earned it the name "Garden of Dreams."

Under Government of Nepal
After the fall of the Rana regime, Kaiser Mahal was occupied and owned by Kaiser Shamsher Jang Bahadur Rana but later he sold it to government of Nepal.
Currently this palace is occupied by the Kaiser library, and Sampati Suddhikaran Aayog.

Earthquake 2015
This palace was partially damaged during the April 2015 Nepal earthquake. Kaiser Mahal was designated safe and received a yellow sticker. Currently the Kaiser Library, and Sampati Suddhikaran Aayog has started evacuation. The future of this historical building is unknown.

See also
Babarmahal Revisited
Thapathali Durbar
Garden of Dreams
Rana palaces of Nepal

References

Palaces in Kathmandu
Rana palaces of Nepal